Peria Koil is a 1958 Tamil-language film written, produced and directed by A. K. Velan. The film stars Prem Nazir and M. N. Rajam. It was released on 16 September 1958, and failed commercially.

Plot

Cast 
Credits adapted from Film News Anandan:
 Prem Nazir
 M. N. Rajam
 Natarajan
 Chandrakantha
 V. K. Ramasamy
 P. Kannamba
 Manorama
 Parvathi

Production 
Peria Koil was written, produced and directed by A. K. Velan under Arunachalam Pictures. Cinematography was handled by V. K. P. Maniam, the art direction by T. V. Annamalai and the editing by V. P. Natarajan.

Soundtrack 
The soundtrack was composed by K. V. Mahadevan, while the lyrics were written by A. Maruthakasi and P. K. Muthuswami.

Release 
Peria Koil was released on 16 September 1958 all over South India. In Madras, it was distributed by Brilliant Pictures. The film failed commercially.

References

External links 
 

1950s Tamil-language films
Films scored by K. V. Mahadevan
Indian drama films